Zhan Jun is a Chinese major general in the People's Liberation Army (PLA). He was investigated by the PLA's anti-graft agency in December 2014. His case was handed over to military prosecutors in March 2015. He once served as head of the logistic department of Hubei Military District and deputy commander of Hubei Military District.

References

External links

Living people
People's Liberation Army generals from Hubei
Year of birth missing (living people)